Live …My Truck Is My Home is a live album by singer/songwriter Marshall Crenshaw, which includes performances from 1982 to 1994.

Track listing
All songs written by Marshall Crenshaw, except where noted.
"Fantastic Planet of Love" – 4:39
"Wanda and Duane" (Dave Alvin) – 4:18
"You're My Favorite Waste of Time" – 3:32
"Like a Vague Memory" – 3:18
"Tonight" (Rob Tyner, Wayne Kramer, Fred "Sonic" Smith) – 3:11
"Calling Out for Love (At Crying Time)" (Crenshaw, Don Dixon) – 4:47
"Twine Time" (Andre Williams, Verlie Rice) – 4:07
"Julie" (Chip Taylor) – 2:39
"Cynical Girl" – 2:51
"Have You Seen Her Face" (Chris Hillman) – 2:58
"There She Goes Again" – 2:49
"Girls…" – 3:06
"Knowing Me, Knowing You" (Benny Andersson, Björn Ulvaeus, Stig Anderson) – 4:21
"You Should've Been There" (Crenshaw, Leroy Preston) – 4:08

Personnel 
 Kenny Aronoff - drums
 Glen Burtnik - guitar, organ, backing vocals
 Marshall Crenshaw - vocals, guitar
 Robert Crenshaw - drums, backing vocals
 Chris Donato - bass, backing vocals
 Steve Holley - drums
 Richard Kennedy - guitar, backing vocals
 Graham Maby - bass, guitar, backing vocals
 Ron Pangborn - drums
 Jules Shear - backing vocals, shaker

References 

1994 live albums
Marshall Crenshaw albums